Josh Dean (born November 7, 1982) is an American football coach and former player. He is the head football coach at Lincoln University in Oxford, Pennsylvania, a position he has held since 2018. Dean served as the head football coach at Kentucky State University from 2013 to 2015. He played college football at San Diego State University before embarking on a professional football career. He was an offseason free agent signee for the Chicago Bears and played for one season for the Cologne Centurions of the NFL Europe in 2006.

Head coaching record

References

External links
 Lincoln profile
 Football Database profile
 Sports-Reference player profile

1982 births
Living people
American football defensive backs
American football linebackers
Campbellsville Tigers football coaches
Chicago Bears players
Cologne Centurions (NFL Europe) players
Fort Valley State Wildcats football coaches
Kentucky State Thorobreds football coaches
Lincoln Lions football coaches
San Diego State Aztecs football players